Noctua tertia is a moth of the family Noctuidae. It is found in the Balkans (Greece and Bulgaria), Turkey and Iran. It has recently been recorded from forests in Upper Galilee (Nahal Keziv, Mount Meron) in Israel.

Adults are on wing in August. There is one generation per year.

External links
 Noctuinae of Israel

Noctua (moth)
Moths of Europe
Moths of Asia
Moths of the Middle East
Moths described in 1991